Amina I of the Maldives also called Amina Kabafaanu and Aminath Kabafan (2 February 1724 – died after 1773), was sultana regnant of the Maldives from 1753 until 1754.  She also served as joint regent with her spouse Ali Shah Bandar Vela’ana’a Manikufa’anu in 1773 during the pilgrimage of her brother Sultan Muhammed Ghiya'as ud-din to Mecca.

Life
Amina was the eldest daughter of Sultan Ibrahim Iskandar II of the Maldives (r. 1720–1750) and Aisha Manikfan, and the sister of Sultan Muhammed Ghiya'as ud-din. In September 1743, she married Ali Shah Bandar Vela’ana’a Manikufa’anu, son of Addu Ali Takurufan.

In 1750, her father died and was succeeded by her paternal uncle, Sultan Muhammad Imaduddin III (d. 1757). In 1752, he was taken captive by Ali Raja of Cannanore and imprisoned in Kavaratti island in the Laccadives, and Male was occupied by the Malabars of Cannanore. After 17 weeks of occupation, Male was freed from the Malabars by Muleegey Dom Hassan Maniku, also called Hassan Manikfan.

First rule

When Male was freed, Amina was installed monarch. Her ascension to the throne was neither rejected nor challenged: 
"Aminath Kabafan the daughter of king Ibrahim became the leader and she ruled Maldives with Hassan Manikfan. Everyone agreed to this arrangement."

In 1754, Amina abdicated in favor of her nine-year-old cousin Amina Rani Kilegefa’anu, daughter of the imprisoned former sultan, with Muleegey Hassan Manikfaan as regent. The reason given for her abdication has been the plots orchestrated by the opposition to her de facto co-regent, Muleegey Hassan Manikfaan, as well as trouble over her debts to the French trader Monsieur Le Termellier.

Exile
After her abdication, Amina retired to Hitadoo island on the Addu Atoll with her spouse Ali Manikfan. Even in her absence, she was considered a viable threat to the regime, being the eldest daughter of Sultan Ibrahim Iskandar II. Her four younger sisters were not given roles of significance in governing, despite being married to high-ranking men with titles. She was apparently trained in warfare and even initiated an attempt to rally support for her claim.

Warned by travelers from Male that there were plans for their arrest, they left for Minicoy with three armed ships. When the news of their trip to Minicoy reached Male, an expedition led by Umar Manik, brother of Hassan Manikfan, were sent to arrest them. After a battle near Kela island channel, Amina and her ship was defeated and captured, and she was brought back to Male with her spouse.  They were exiled to Fenfushi island in September 1754.

In 1759, her niece queen Amina II was deposed and succeeded by her uncle Hasan 'Izz ud-din who ascended after hearing news of Sultan Muhammadh Imaduddin III's demise to fill the throne in absentia of Dhiyamigili heir to throne Muhammadh Ghiyath al-Din, who was held captive by Ali Raja.

Second rule
Hasan 'Izz ud-din abdicated the throne to Sultan Muhammadh Ghiyath al-Din on his return.

On 17 December 1773, her brother sultan Muhammed Ghiya'as ud-din left for his haj pilgrimage to Mecca in the company of his spouse, minister Ali Hakura Manikfan and minister Ali Doshimeyna Manikfan. He appointed his sister Amina to administer the affairs of state as regent in his absence, jointly with her spouse Ali Velana Manikfan.

During their regency, however, a coup took place and the followers around Amina's husband Ali Velana Manikfan deposed her absent brother and had him proclaimed monarch.  They were declared rebels by the loyalists of the absent king and soon deposed by a counter cup, and Muhammad Shamsuddeen II was placed on the throne. Amina and her spouse were arrested and expelled to Huliyandoo island on Laam atoll, where they eventually died.

References

External links
 Women leaders
 Women in Power
 History of the Maldives

18th-century sultans of the Maldives
18th-century women rulers
1724 births
History of the Maldives
Maldivian women in politics
Year of death unknown